"Touch by Touch" is a song by Austrian Euro disco band Joy, released in 1985 as the second single from their debut album, Hello. The song was a huge success in their homeland, where it reached number one. In Germany, the song reached the top 20, peaking at No. 18 in 1986. It also became a hit in East Asia and the Philippines, and remains as the band's signature song.

Charts

References

1985 songs
1985 singles
Joy (Austrian band) songs
Number-one singles in Austria
Sonet Records singles